Yang di-Pertuan may refer to:

 Yang di-Pertuan Agong, constitutional monarch and head of state of Malaysia
 Yang di-Pertuan Besar, a royal title
 Yang di-Pertuan Negara, a title for the head of state in certain Malay-speaking countries